William Charlton may refer to:

Politicians
William Andrew Charlton (1841–1930), Canadian politician
William Charlton (died 1567), MP for Shropshire
William Charlton (Wisconsin politician) (1831–1908), American farmer and politician

Sportsmen
Billy Charlton (1900–1981), English footballer
Bill Charlton (1912–?), English footballer

Others
William Browell Charlton (1855–1932), British trade union leader
William Charlton, musician in The Strange Death of Liberal England
Bill Charlton (businessman), on This Is the Law